The 1933 International Lawn Tennis Challenge was the 28th edition of what is now known as the Davis Cup. 24 teams would enter the Europe Zone; while 9 would enter the Americas Zone, 4 in North America and 5 in South America.

The United States defeated Argentina in the America Inter-Zonal Final, and Great Britain defeated Australia in the Europe Zone final. In the Inter-Zonal play-off Great Britain defeated United States, and went on to defeat France in the Challenge Round. Great Britain's victory ended France's six-year run as champions and gave the Great Britain team their first title since 1912. The final was played at Stade Roland Garros in Paris, France on 28–30 July.

America Zone

North & Central America Zone

South America Zone

Americas Inter-Zonal final
United States vs. Argentina

Europe Zone

Draw

Final
Great Britain vs. Australia

Inter-Zonal final
Great Britain vs. United States

Challenge Round
France vs. Great Britain

See also
 1933 Wightman Cup

References

External links
Davis Cup official website

Davis Cups by year
 
International Lawn Tennis Challenge
International Lawn Tennis Challenge
International Lawn Tennis Challenge
International Lawn Tennis Challenge